Gwendy's Button Box is a horror novella  by American writers Stephen King and Richard Chizmar. It was announced by Entertainment Weekly on February 28, 2017.
The American edition published by Cemetery Dance included illustrations by Keith Minnion. The French edition released by Le Livre de Poche in September 2018, reproduced those illustrations with brand new ones by the same artist.

A sequel titled Gwendy's Magic Feather, penned solely by Chizmar, was released in November 2019. In November 2020, Chizmar announced that he and King were writing a third installment in the series titled Gwendy's Final Task, this time as a full-length novel. It was published in 2022.

Plot
The story takes place in King's fictional town of Castle Rock in 1974. Twelve-year-old Gwendy Peterson encounters a stranger in dark clothes and a black hat who invites her to "palaver."

Conception
"I had a story I couldn't finish, and [Chizmar] showed me the way home with style and panache," King said in a statement. In describing the writing process, Richard Chizmar said, "Steve sent me the first chunk of a short story. I added quite a bit and sent it back to him. He did a pass, then bounced it back to me for another pass. Then, we did the same thing all over again – one more draft each. Next thing you know, we had a full-length novella on our hands. We took a free hand in rewriting each other and adding new ideas and characters. The whole process took about a month."

References

Novellas by Stephen King
American horror novels
2017 American novels
Collaborative novels
Cemetery Dance Publications books